The 2016–17 season was the eighth season of Valencia CF's women's team. In it Valencia attained its best result in Primera División, a third position, and was the team with the fewest goals against in the championship – 11 in 30 games.

On April 23, 2017 the team played for the first team in the Mestalla stadium. A crowd of 17,000 attended a record 6–0 victory over its major rival Levante.

Season summary

Background and preseason
Valencia CFF ended the 2015–16 Primera División sixth, two positions below the previous edition (which had been their best result to date), while in the Copa de la Reina they reached the semifinals, where they lost against Atlético Madrid after extra time. Following the end of the season team captain Arantxa Lozano and reserve goalkeeper Gemma Rueda retired, leaving new captain Ivana Andrés as the only remaining player from the inaugural 2009–10 squad. Naiara Beristain, Sara Monforte and Mulán Sánchez transferred to other Primera División teams, while Willy Romero was the only 2015–16 signing to leave the club and moved to the Eredivisie.

The club continued the bet for Latin American football they had initiated in the previous two seasons with Joyce Magalhães and Natalia Gaitán. Marianela Szymanowski joined the attack and Tiane Endler, who had returned to Colo-Colo after one season in Chelsea, became the new first-choice goalkeeper. With the season started the club signed players from the NWSL for the first time: Yanara Aedo joined the team in September and Estefi Banini after playing the NWSL final against Western New York Flash. Additionally three national players were signed: former international Débora García for the wings and the U19 international Leles Carrión and Esther Romero for the midfield. Marta Peiró made a breakthrough from the farm team and became the team's second top scorer despite playing few games as a starter.

Valencia played against four Primera División teams and one local Segunda División team in the preseason, earning three wins and two draws. For the first time the team didn't take part in the COTIF Tournament.

Season
Valencia started the season with three wins before conceding two draws in its two journeys to Andalusia, against Sporting Huelva and newly promoted Betis. Next the team defeated defending champion Athletic Bilbao, which scored the first goal conceded by Valencia in the season after seven games. The team didn't win any games in November, with four draws (including title containding Atlético Madrid and Barcelona) and one lose in the first Valencia derby played in a LFP stadium, the Ciutat de València.

However, this was followed by a remarkable streak up to April with 10 wins in 11 games and only one goal conceded. Following a second draw against Atlético, the club also held the Spring Valencian derby in Mestalla. It was the first time the women's team played in the main stadium, and it attracted a 17,000 crowd. Valencia's previous major win over Levante, 2015–16's 3–0, was surpassed by half-time with a 4–0 scoreline and the game ended as 6–0, Valencia's largest win in the season.

With no Champions League qualifying options, Valencia secured the 3rd place (surpassing the 2014–15 4th position as its best result in the championship) with three games remaining with a 1–3 win over Granadilla. After suffering its second defeat in the season against Barcelona, Valencia won the last two games to end the championship with 68 points – 19 more than in the previous season. Tiane Endler won the Zamora Trophy with a 0.39 coefficient, and Mari Paz Vilas was the third top scorer in the championship with 28 goals in 27 appearances.

In the Copa de la Reina the team made its third appearance in a row in the semifinals by defeating Athletic 3–1. There it lost 1–2 to Barcelona, which won the competition. Vilas scored Valencia's last goal in the season in the additional time. Two Valencia players were subsequently included in Spanish call-up for the UEFA Women's Euro 2017: Paula Nicart and Mari Paz Vilas.

Transfers

Squad

Results

 
Numbers in brackets in league games show the team's position in the table following the match

Pre-season

Primera División

League table

Results

Copa de la Reina

Primera División statistics

References

2016–17 in Spanish women's football
Valencia Femenino
Valencia CF Femenino seasons